Batanagar is a neighbourhood in the Maheshtala of the South 24 Parganas district in the Indian state of West Bengal. It is a part of the area covered by the Kolkata Metropolitan Development Authority (KMDA).

History
Batanagar was established to start the first shoe factory in India by Czechoslovak industrialist Tomáš Baťa. The Bata brand was established on 24 August 1894 in Zlín, then in Austria-Hungary (now in Czech Republic). The company first established itself in India in 1931 by renting a building to start an experimental shoe production plant in Konnagar with 75 Czechoslovak experts. Jan Antonín Baťa then built up an industrial manufacturing city called Batanagar in 1934, as well as other factories in Delhi and Patna and elsewhere in India, employing more than 7,000 people. Later Batanagar became one of the bigger suburban cities near Kolkata.

Geography

Area overview
Alipore Sadar subdivision is the most urbanized part of the South 24 Parganas district. 59.85% of the population lives in the urban areas and 40.15% lives in the rural areas. In the northern portion of the subdivision (shown in the map alongside) there are 21 census towns. The entire district is situated in the Ganges Delta and the subdivision, on the east bank of the Hooghly River, is an alluvial stretch, with industrial development.

Note: The map alongside presents some of the notable locations in the subdivision. All places marked in the map are linked in the larger full screen map.

Location

Economy
It is one of the places named after the multinational shoe company Bata. There is a plant of the Bata company here. The employees mostly reside in Batanagar. Not only the Bata India Shoe factory, another very remarkable feature of Batanagar, is that shoe-making is a predominant cottage industry in Batanagar. Countless houses and families are dedicated to manufacturing shoes of various makes - leather, PVC, jute, etc. for some of the leading shoe brands in India. For example - Khadim's, SreeLeathers, Titas and Liberty which are some of the most renowned shoe makers in India, have outsourced a major portion of their shoe making process to the various entities in Batanagar. Every alternate home in Batanagar houses a small unit which is manufacturing shoes.

This feature was born out of necessity, as most of the families residing in Batanagar are dependent on the Bata factory for their livelihood, hence whenever the factory gets locked-out, these families are very severely affected. Hence shoe making from their homes has given them an alternate source of earning.

Transport
Batanagar is on the Budge Budge Trunk Road.

Nangi railway station is located nearby.

Education
Techno International Batanagar, established in 2012, offers diploma, undergraduate and postgraduate degree courses in Engineering and Technology and other allied fields.

References

External links
 

Cities and towns in South 24 Parganas district
Neighbourhoods in Kolkata
Kolkata Metropolitan Area